Artur Bombel   (born 14 December 1992) is a Belarusian professional football player most recently playing for Lida.

Career
Bombel was born in Grodno, at the age of nineteen he began playing professional football with local club FC Neman Grodno in 2010, he didn't make a single appearance in his first season at the club, in the 2011 season Bombel made his debut against Dnepr Mogilev and the match was drawn 1-1 he played twenty-six minutes in the match. Bombel finished the 2011 season with two appearances in total, in the 2012 season Bombel appeared in four league and 3 cup matches for FC Neman Grodno. During the current season Bombel has made four appearances for the club, taking his total appearances to 10 league and 3 cup appearances.

On 16 January 2020, the BFF banned Bombel for 12 months for his involvement in the match fixing.

International
Bombel has been capped at youth levels up to Belarus U21 level.

References

External links
 
 

1992 births
Living people
Belarusian footballers
Association football forwards
FC Neman Grodno players
FC Lida players